Swains Island (Tokelauan: Olohega ; Samoan: Olosega ) is a remote coral atoll in the Tokelau Islands in the South Pacific Ocean. The island is the subject of an ongoing territorial dispute between Tokelau and the United States, which has administered it as part of American Samoa since 1925. Privately owned by the family of Eli Hutchinson Jennings since 1856, Swains Island was used as a copra plantation until 1967. It has not been permanently inhabited since 2008 but has often been visited by members of the Jennings family, scientific researchers, and amateur radio operators.

Etymology
A persistent misconception about Swains Island is its supposed discovery on 2 March 1606 by Pedro Fernandes de Queirós, a famous Portuguese navigator who sailed for Spain. On that day, he reckoned an island at 10°36'S 171°W, and his ship's historian named it Isla de la Gente Hermosa (meaning "island of the beautiful people" in Spanish), after its inhabitants. The closest island to that reckoned location is Swains Island at 11°03'S 171°05'W, leading later authors to identify it as the same, and thus refer to it by that Spanish name or by the Spanish version of the navigator's last name, Quirós (also spelled Quiros in English). However, the island described by Queirós was significantly larger, and at the time the calculation of longitude had a much greater uncertainty than latitude, leading later scholars to conclude that the island found by Queirós was actually Rakahanga, lying  to the east at 10°02'S 161°05'W.

Captain William L. Hudson of the USS Peacock saw the island on 1 February 1841, during the United States Exploring Expedition of 1838–42. He claimed to have learned about the island's location from a certain Captain Swain of Nantucket, and after concluding that it did not match the description by Queirós, resolved to call it Swain's Island (the apostrophe was later dropped):

"[F]rom having its position very nearly pointed out to me by Capt. Swain of Nantucket who stated to me at Tahiti that he had seen it in passing – and in consequence of its being a considerable distance in latitude from, and not agreeing in size or character with the island described by Queros – in addition to this in view of it being peopled with a beautiful race – it is uninhabited and perhaps we are the first that have ever set foot upon it – thus much for its name."

This Captain Swain has not been conclusively identified. Authors have suggested Jonathan Swain of whaler Independence in 1820, or William C. Swain of whaler George Champlain in the 1830s. Other evidence suggests Obed Swain of whaler Jefferson of Nantucket, who, unlike William C. Swain, actually was at Tahiti when the United States Exploring Expedition was there with the USS Peacock and Captain Hudson.

In Tokelauan, the main language formerly spoken on Swains Island, the island is called Olohega . The name is composed of the prefix olo-, indicating a collective noun, and the word hega, meaning a tuft of feathers tied to the end of a skipjack lure, possibly referring to the island's location at the end of the Tokelau chain. A variant of this name is Olosega , either also in Tokelauan or in Samoan, another language formerly spoken there. It should not be confused with the homonymous island in the pair Ofu-Olosega of the Manu‘a group in American Samoa.

It is also called Jennings Island, after Eli Hutchinson Jennings, who settled there in 1856 and whose family still owns and manages the island.

Geography

The atoll is somewhat unusual, featuring an unbroken circle of land enclosing a lagoon separated from the sea. Its water has a salinity of about 0.4%, described as brackish, useful for bathing and washing but not for drinking. Drinking water in the island is derived entirely from rainfall collected in tanks.

Nearly all of the land is filled with coconut palms. The village of Taulaga (meaning harbor or town), in the west of the island, consists of a malae (open ceremonial space) surrounded by houses, but as of 2013 the only structure still standing was a church, built around 1886. The village of Etena (meaning Eden), in the south, contains the former residence of the Jennings family, also built in the 1880s but abandoned after a cyclone severely damaged it in 2005. A road named Belt Road used to circle the entire island, but as of 2013 only the portion connecting the two villages was usable, the rest being covered in vegetation. The island also contains several cemeteries.

Fauna
The island has been recognised as an Important Bird Area (IBA) by BirdLife International because it supports a breeding population of white terns. Seven reptile species have been recorded from the island, including three geckos and three skinks, as well as the green sea turtles which formerly nested on the island, but now occur only as visitors to inshore waters.

Demographics

Swains Island first appeared in the U.S. census in 1930, following its annexation to American Samoa in 1925.

The 2010 census counted 17 people in 6 households. There were 8 males (ages 20 to 61) and 9 females (3 under age 18, 6 ages 18 to 61). There were 11 U.S. nationals (8 born in American Samoa, and 3 in the United States) and 6 foreign nationals (4 born in Samoa, 1 in Tokelau, and 1 in the Philippines). They reported their ethnic origins as 15 Samoans, 1 Tokelauan, and 1 Filipino. Of the 16 people over age 5, 15 spoke mainly Samoan, and 1 spoke another Oceanic language, but all also spoke English.

However, the people counted in the 2010 census did not permanently reside on Swains Island. Multiple visitors have reported the island as uninhabited since 2008. The 2020 census recorded no residents there.

History
Anthropologists indicate that the island was initially settled by Polynesian voyagers and later conquered by Tokelauans from Fakaofo.

Whalers from New England began visiting the island in the 1830s or earlier. Frenchmen established copra production there around that time, during which the native population fled due to violence by the foreigners.

Captain William L. Hudson of the USS Peacock saw the island on 1 February 1841, during the United States Exploring Expedition of 1838–42. He named it Swain's Island after a certain Captain Swain, from whom he had learned about the island's location.

The Jennings family

Fakaofoans returned to the island soon after Hudson's visit, and were joined by three Frenchmen, who then left to sell the coconut oil they had accumulated. In 1856, an American, Eli Hutchinson Jennings (14November 18144December 1878), joined a community on Swains with his Samoan wife, Malia. Jennings claimed to have received title to the atoll from a British Captain Turnbull, who claimed ownership of the island by discovery and named it after himself. According to one account, the sale price for Swains was 15 shillings per acre (37 shillings per hectare), and a bottle of gin. One of the Frenchmen later returned, but did not care to share the island with Jennings and left.

On 13 October 1856, Swains became a semi-independent proprietary settlement of the Jennings family (although under the U.S. flag), a status it would retain for approximately seventy years. It was also claimed for the U.S. by the United States Guano Company in 1860, under the Guano Islands Act.

Jennings established a coconut plantation, which flourished under his son, Eli Jr. Eli Jennings Sr. was also instrumental in helping Peruvian "blackbird" slave ships to depopulate the other three Tokelau atolls.

American sovereignty
In 1907, the Resident Commissioner of the British Gilbert and Ellice Islands (then a British protectorate; since 1979 the sovereign nations of Kiribati and Tuvalu) claimed that Swains belonged to the United Kingdom, demanding payment of a tax of US$85.  Jennings paid, but he brought the matter before the U.S. State Department, and his money was ultimately refunded. The British government furthermore conceded that Swains was an American possession.

The ownership of the island came into question after Eli Jr.'s death in 1920 and that of his wife in 1921.  The United States decided to give the right of administration jointly to Eli's daughter Ann and son Alexander, while making it officially part of American Samoa by annexation on 4 March 1925.  Alexander Jennings, the son of Eli Jennings, Jr., became managing owner of the island.  The population at this time was around 100. During World War II, the island had a population of 125, and had a naval radio station.

In 1953, labor troubles arose on Swains when Tokelauan-hired workers decided to claim "squatters' rights" to the atoll, by virtue of having lived on it year-round.  After Alexander Jennings evicted 56 workers and their families from the island, the governor of American Samoa intervened.  By executive order, the governor acknowledged Jennings' proprietary rights to Swains Island, while instituting a system of labor contracts and a local governmental structure to protect the rights of his employees.  The islanders were also guaranteed a representative in the territorial legislature.

Recent sovereignty and trade issues

On 25 March 1981, New Zealand, of which Tokelau is a dependency, confirmed U.S. sovereignty over Swains Island in the Treaty of Tokehega, under which the United States surrendered its territorial claims to the other islands of Tokelau. In the draft constitution that was the subject of the 2006 Tokelau self-determination referendum, however, Swains Island is claimed as part of Tokelau.  As of March 2007, American Samoa has not yet taken an official position, but the Governor of American Samoa Togiola Tulafono has said he believes that his government should do everything it can to retain control of the island.

Tokelau's claim to Swains is generally comparable to the Marshall Islands' claim to Wake Island (also administered by the U.S.). The re-emergence of this issue in the mid-2000s was an unintended consequence of the United Nations' efforts to promote decolonization in Tokelau in the early 2000s. Tokelauans are reluctant to disown a common cultural, and thus national, identity with Swains Islanders who speak their language.

In 2007 Tokelau's regional parliament, the General Fono, considered the adoption of a new flag for their nation which showed a map depicting Swains Island, as a fourth star in addition to three others, at a proportional distance to that of the others. Ultimately a compromise was adopted whereby the four stars were retained, but with the arrangement and proportionality suggestive of the Southern Cross.

During a 2007 visit to Tokelau, Alexander Jennings, representative of Swains Island to the American Samoa legislature, indicated a desire for better trade links between Swains and its neighbor, saying he believed the then head of government of Tokelau, Kuresa Nasau, was also interested in improved relations.

Cyclone Percy 2005
In February 2005, Cyclone Percy struck the island, causing widespread damage and virtually destroying the village of Taulaga, as well as the old Jennings estate at Etena. Only seven people were on the island at the time. Coast Guard airdrops ensured that the islanders were not left without food, water and other necessities.  A United States Coast Guard visit in March 2007 listed 12 to 15 inhabitants, and showed that the island's trees had largely survived the cyclone.

Amateur radio
Swains Island was first "discovered" as a possible amateur radio "entity" for American Radio Relay League (ARRL) Award purposes by Kan Mizoguchi JA1BK in 2005.  He led a ham radio DXpedition there in 2005, however, the ARRL did not accept it for credit.  Eventually the ARRL decided to approve  Swains Island as a new "entity" based on the separation distance between it and American Samoa.  Once accepted, Kan JA1BK led another DXpedition to the island (KH8SI) which did qualify as the first valid operation.  The team consisted of JA1BK F6EXV JH1JGX/AH7C K1ER & K8YSE. 16,390 contacts were made.

Due to its remoteness, Swains Island is considered a separate amateur radio "entity" and several visits have been made by ham operators.  The 2007 amateur radio "DXpedition", with call sign N8S, made more than 117,000 contacts worldwide.  This set a new world record for an expedition using generator power and tents for living accommodations, since broken by the 2012 DXpedition to Malpelo Island.

In 2012, Swains Island hosted the DXpedition NH8S; this group arrived on September 5, 2012 and departed on September 19, 2012. A total of 105,455 radio contacts were made.
The DXCC Country code is 515, ITU Zone 62, and CQ Zone 32.

Island government
According to the Interior Department survey cited above, Swains Island is governed by the American Samoa "government representative", a village council, a pulenu'u (civic head of the village), and a leoleo (policeman).  Swains Island officials have the same rights, duties, and qualifications as in all the other villages of American Samoa. Neither the proprietor of Swains Island nor any employee of his may serve as government representative.

The government representative has the following duties:

to act as the governor's representative on Swains Island
to mediate between employees and their employer
to enforce those laws of the United States and of American Samoa which apply on Swains Island
to enforce village regulations
to keep the governor apprised of the state of affairs on Swains Island, particularly on the islanders' health, education, safety, and welfare
to ensure that Swains Islanders continue to enjoy the rights, privileges, and immunities accorded to them by the laws of the United States and of American Samoa
to ensure that the proprietary rights of the owner are respected

The government representative has the following rights, powers, and obligations:

to make arrests
to quell breaches of the peace
to call meetings of the village council to consider special subjects
to take such actions as may be reasonably necessary to implement and render effective his duties

Swains Island's village council consists of all men of sound mind over the age of twenty-four. According to the federal census in 1980, five men fell into this category.

Every two years, Swains Island sends one non-voting delegate to the American Samoan territorial legislature. Since 2004, this office has been held by Alexander Jennings. In October 2020 at a meeting of Swain islanders in Tafuna, American Samoa, he was re-elected for the ninth time.

The Jennings dynasty
Styling themselves "leaders" or "proprietors", members of the Jennings family ruled Swains Island virtually independent of any outside authority from 1856 to 1925. After 1925, while retaining proprietary ownership of the island, they were subject to the jurisdiction of the U.S. territory of American Samoa.

Jenningses who ruled as semi-independent "proprietors":
13 October 1856 – 4 December 1878: Eli Hutchinson Jennings, Sr. (1814–1878)
4 December 1878 – 25 October 1891: Malia Jennings, his Samoan widow (d. 1891)
25 October 1891 – 24 October 1920: Eli Hutchinson Jennings, Jr., (1863–1920) son of Eli, Sr. and Malia, referred to by Robert Louis Stevenson as "King Jennings" during a visit to the island.
24 October 1920 – August 1921: Ann Eliza Jennings Carruthers (1897–1921), jointly with sibling, Alexander Hutchinson Jennings; both children of Eli Jr.
24 October 1920 – 4 March 1925: Alexander Hutchinson Jennings III

Jenningses who ruled under direct American jurisdiction:
4 March 1925 – Unknown date in 1940s: Alexander Hutchinson Jennings III
Unknown Dates between 1940–1954: Alexander E. Jennings
1954 to present: local government instituted by American Samoa. However, the island is still owned by the Jennings family.

In popular culture
Swains Island: One of the Last Jewels of the Planet (2014), directed and narrated by Jean-Michel Cousteau, is the first American Samoan film to be entered in the Blue Ocean Festival in Florida.

The band Te Vaka has written a song called Haloa Olohega ("Poor Olohega" in Tokelauan), lamenting about the loss of the island for Tokelau.

Notes

References

External links
US Dept. of Interior history and description of Swains Island Introduction to Swains Island geography and history.
"Memorable events on Swains" 2005 Story from the Samoa News about a 1920s visit to Swains Island.
"A queen mother's last wish" Article in the Honolulu Advertiser about the death of Eliza Jennings Thompson, "queen mother" of Swains Island.
American Samoa, its districts and unorganized islands, United States Census Bureau
Alert for Cyclone Percy Gives 2005 population.
History of Swains Island
WorldStatesmen- American Samoa
Tokelau looks to independence
 An account of a visit to Swain's Island in the 1960s

Islands of American Samoa
Disputed islands
Disputed islands of Oceania
International territorial disputes of the United States
Atolls of American Samoa
Territorial disputes of New Zealand
Private islands of New Zealand
Pacific islands claimed under the Guano Islands Act
Private islands of the United States
Important Bird Areas of the Tokelau Islands
Important Bird Areas of American Samoa
Seabird colonies